Konovalenko may refer to:
 
Konovalenko (surname)
Minor planet 18121 Konovalenko
Konovalenko Sports Palace,  indoor sporting arena in Nizhny Novgorod, Russia